C.M.S Press was the first printing press in Kerala. It was established in 1821 by Rev. Benjamin Baily, a British missionary, at Cottayam College, also known as 'Syrian College'. The college was a seat of English general education in the State of Travancore and is regarded as ''the first locale to start English education" in Kerala and the first to have Englishmen as teachers in 1815 itself. Since the missionaries stayed in the residence of Cottayam College, they established the first press in Kerala at 'kottayam College' now called as 'Pazhaya Seminary'or 'Old Seminary' in Chungom, Kottayam.

History
The first Malayalam Book printed in Kerala, 'Cherupaitangalku Upakarardham Englishil ninnu Paribhashapedutiya Kadhakal',(which consists of short stories for children translated from English) by Benjamin Baily was printed at CMS press in Kottayam in 1824. C.M.S Press published complete Malayalam translation of the Bible in 1842 and a Malayalam- English Dictionary in 1846. Njananikshepam (in Malayalam:ജ്ഞാനനിക്ഷേപം), the first printed News paper published in Kerala, has been printed and published from 1848 from this press.

C.M.S Press undertook printing works in the languages of Malayalam, English, Tamil, Sanskrit, Latin and Syriac. C.M.S Press was the first polyglot printing office as well as the first book publishing house in Kerala.

See also
Printing press
Church Missionary Society
Media in Kerala

References 

Printing companies